A by-election was held for the New South Wales Legislative Assembly electorate of Monaro on 17 December 1889 because of the death  of Harold Stephen.

Dates

Candidates

 David Myers was a solicitor from Bombala who had been unsuccessful at the election in January 1889 by a margin of 262 votes (8.4%).
 Gus Miller was a journalist and the proprietor of the Cooma Express.

Result

Harold Stephen died.

See also
Electoral results for the district of Monaro
List of New South Wales state by-elections

References

New South Wales state by-elections
1889 elections in Australia
1890s in New South Wales